Khabardaar is a 2005 Marathi comedy film produced and directed by Mahesh Kothare and starring Bharat Jadhav, Sanjay Narvekar, and Nirmiti Sawant.

The film was inspired by the 1940 classic American film His Girl Friday starring Cary Grant and Rosalind Russell.

Plot

Bharat Bhalerao (Jadhav) is a crime reporter at the newspaper Khabardar. His boss, Gauri Shringarpure (Sawant), tasks him with gathering information about an escaped prisoner, Anna Chimbori (Apte). Maruti Kamble (Narvekar) is a truck driver. Maruti becomes the witness to a murder that the prisoner commits. Maruti is accused of the murder and has to run for his life. The only person who can help him is Bharat, the crime reporter. Maruti teams up with Bharat to uncover the truth and bring Anna to justice.

Cast

 Bharat Jadhav as Bharat Bhalerao, Star Reporter of Khabardar
 Sanjay Narvekar as Maruti Kamble, Truck Driver
 Nirmiti Sawant as Miss Gauri Shringarpure, Chief Editor of Khabardar
 Madhura Velankar as Priyanka Garware, Bharat's Girlfriend and Fiancé
 Mugdha Shah as Priyanka's Mother, Owner of Garware Industries
 Kishori Godbole as Tulsi Kamble, Maruti's Wife
 Rasika Joshi as Maruti's Mother
 Pandharinath Kamble as Paddy, Reporter and Secretary for Miss Gauri Shringarpure
 Vinay Apte as Anna Chimbori, Renowned Gangster and Terrorist
 Resham Tipnis as Item number in the song "Payal Baje Cham Cham"
 Vijay Chavan as Home Minister
 Makarand Anaspure as Mr More, Foster Minister of Haripur 
 Sunil Tawde as Chandraji Suryaji Pisal, Senior Inspector
 Seva More as Monica
 Ameya Hunaswadkar as Fellow Reporter

References

External links
 

2006 films
2000s Marathi-language films
Films directed by Mahesh Kothare